New Chapel Hill is a city in Smith County, Texas, United States. The population was 620 at the 2020 census. It is part of the Tyler, Texas Metropolitan Statistical Area.

Geography

New Chapel Hill is located at  (32.303556, –95.169229).

According to the United States Census Bureau, the city has a total area of 2.5 square miles (6.4 km2), all land.

Demographics

As of the 2020 United States census, there were 620 people, 235 households, and 182 families residing in the city.

As of the census of 2000, there were 553 people, 205 households, and 157 families residing in the city. The population density was 225.2 people per square mile (86.8/km2). There were 221 housing units at an average density of 90.0/sq mi (34.7/km2). The racial makeup of the city was 97.83% White, 0.90% African American, 0.36% Native American, 0.54% Asian, 0.36% from other races. Hispanic or Latino of any race were 2.35% of the population.

There were 205 households, out of which 37.6% had children under the age of 18 living with them, 64.9% were married couples living together, 8.3% had a female householder with no husband present, and 23.4% were non-families. 19.0% of all households were made up of individuals, and 8.3% had someone living alone who was 65 years of age or older. The average household size was 2.70 and the average family size was 3.11.

In the city, the population was spread out, with 27.3% under the age of 18, 11.6% from 18 to 24, 29.8% from 25 to 44, 19.9% from 45 to 64, and 11.4% who were 65 years of age or older. The median age was 33 years. For every 100 females, there were 107.1 males. For every 100 females age 18 and over, there were 103.0 males.

The median income for a household in the city was $42,763, and the median income for a family was $47,000. Males had a median income of $28,000 versus $26,875 for females. The per capita income for the city was $16,869. None of the families and 2.6% of the population were living below the poverty line, including no under eighteens and 12.7% of those over 64.

Education
The City of New Chapel Hill is served by the Chapel Hill Independent School District.

References

External links
New Chapel Hill, TX in the Handbook of Texas

Cities in Texas
Cities in Smith County, Texas